Diamondvale is a rural locality in the Southern Downs Region, Queensland, Australia.

Geography 
The locality is bounded by Quart Pot Creek to the south and Kettle Swamp Creek to the north-west.

The predominant land use is grazing on native vegetation.

History 
The locality was named and bounded on 15 December 2000.

Education 
There are no schools in Diamondvale. The nearest government primary and secondary schools are Stanthorpe State School and Stanthorpe State High School in neighbouring Stanthorpe to the west.

References 

Southern Downs Region
Localities in Queensland